The Women's Rugby League European Championship is an international rugby league football tournament for European national teams first held in 2022.

History
The creation of Women's Rugby League European Championships was announced by the ERL in May 2022 with the inaugural edition taking place between June to October the same year, 87 years after the creation of the men's version of the tournament. The tournament would consist of an A and B league with promotion and relegation between them, as the men's tournament has done since 2020. The inaugural edition however, did not feature an A league as A tier countries were competing is the 2021 Women's Rugby League World Cup delayed to 2022 due to the COVID-19 pandemic. The 2022 B league was divided into to two groups, a North and South group, which were won by Wales and Greece respectively.

Results

See also
 Men's Rugby League European Championship
 Wheelchair Rugby League European Championship

Notes

References

European rugby league competitions
Rugby league international tournaments
Women's rugby league competitions